Thomas Lionel Dugdale, 1st Baron Crathorne,  (20 July 1897 – 26 March 1977), known as Sir Thomas Dugdale, 1st Baronet from 1945 to 1959, was a British Conservative Party politician. He resigned as a government minister over the Crichel Down Affair, often quoted as a classic example of the convention of individual ministerial responsibility.

Background and early life
Thomas Dugdale was the son of Captain James Lionel Dugdale, of Crathorne Hall near Yarm in Yorkshire. His grandfather John Dugdale (died 1881) was from a family of Lancashire cotton manufacturers, and had bought the Crathorne estate in 1844.

Dugdale was educated at Eton College and the Royal Military College, Sandhurst. He joined the Army in 1916, serving with the Scots Greys in the First World War and the Yorkshire Hussars in the Second World War.

Political career
In 1929, Dugdale was elected as Member of Parliament (MP) for Richmond, North Yorkshire, where he remained until 1959. He served as Parliamentary Private Secretary to several ministers, including Stanley Baldwin, and Deputy Chief Whip. He was later Chairman of the Conservative Party and Chairman of the Party's Agricultural Committee. He was created a baronet in the 1945 New Year Honours "for political and public services".

The Crichel Down affair
When the Conservatives won the 1951 election, Churchill made Dugdale his Minister of Agriculture and Fisheries.

Crichel Down was a piece of farmland in Dorset compulsorily bought by the government for defence use. Commander George Marten, whose wife Mary was the only child and heiress of the original owner of the land Lord Alington, wanted to buy the land back in the 1950s now that it was no longer used by the Ministry of Defence. However, the Ministry of Agriculture resisted, wishing to use the land for experimental farming in a time of rationing and agricultural development. Marten, a former equerry to the royal family, had very influential friends and stirred up much trouble in the local Conservative Party and on the government backbenches. There followed a public inquiry that criticised the department's decision and its civil servants, especially their methods, which were seen as an example of an over-powerful state.

Finally, in 1954, Dugdale announced that Marten could buy the land back, and told the House of Commons he was resigning.

Resignation
Dugdale's resignation went down in history as an honourable, even heroic, one: a minister taking responsibility for civil servants' actions, which would lead to the perceived code of individual ministerial responsibility. However, in papers released thirty years after the affair it was found that Dugdale had known and approved of his civil servants' actions, and had to an extent passed the buck to them himself. It was also found that the inquiry was inaccurate and biased, having been led by a former Conservative candidate who was very opposed to civil servants and state interference.

Dugdale's junior minister, Lord Carrington, also tendered his resignation, but it was refused. He went on to be Foreign Secretary, resigning the post in 1982 over the Falklands War. Commander Marten received his land, but not a Conservative parliamentary seat, for which he had hoped.

In 1959, Dugdale himself was raised to the peerage as Baron Crathorne, of Crathorne in the North Riding of the County of York. Subsequently, he had a second political career in Europe, building links with parliamentarians in NATO and the Council of Europe.

Family
Dugdale married Nancy, daughter of Sir Charles Tennant, 1st Baronet and Marguerite (née Miles), in 1936. He died in March 1977, aged 79. His son James succeeded him as Baron Crathorne.

Arms

Notes

References 
Kidd, Charles, Williamson, David (editors). Debrett's Peerage and Baronetage (1990 edition). New York: St Martin's Press, 1990,

External links 
 

1897 births
1977 deaths
Agriculture ministers of the United Kingdom
British Army personnel of World War II
British Army personnel of World War I
Chairmen of the Conservative Party (UK)
Dugdale, Thomas
Graduates of the Royal Military College, Sandhurst
Members of the Privy Council of the United Kingdom
Ministers in the Chamberlain peacetime government, 1937–1939
Ministers in the Chamberlain wartime government, 1939–1940
Ministers in the Churchill wartime government, 1940–1945
Ministers in the third Churchill government, 1951–1955
Parliamentary Private Secretaries to the Prime Minister
Hereditary barons created by Elizabeth II
People educated at Eton College
Royal Scots Greys officers
Tennant family
Dugdale, Thomas
Dugdale, Thomas
Dugdale, Thomas
Dugdale, Thomas
Dugdale, Thomas
Dugdale, Thomas
Dugdale, Thomas
Dugdale, Thomas
Yorkshire Hussars officers